Jamaica competed at the 2009 World Championships in Athletics from 15–23 August. A team of 46 athletes was announced in preparation for the competition. Selected athletes achieved one of the competition's qualifying standards. The squad had a number of medal hopes for the sprinting events, including Usain Bolt, Asafa Powell, and Michael Frater in the men's and Veronica Campbell-Brown, Kerron Stewart, and Shelly-Ann Fraser in the women's. Olympic gold medallist Melaine Walker competed in the 400 metres hurdles and 2007 World Championship silver medallists Maurice Smith, Shericka Williams, and Novlene Williams-Mills also feature.

The Jamaican team suffered a number of setbacks before the event: five of the selected athletes (Yohan Blake, Allodin Fothergill, Lansford Spence, Marvin Anderson and Sheri-Ann Brooks) tested positive for the stimulant methylxanthine, although it is unclear whether they will be banned from competition. In a separate incident, the Jamaica Amateur Athletic Association threatened the five athletes in Stephen Francis' Maximising Velocity Power Track Club with deselection after they failed to attend a mandatory training camp in Berlin. The athletes (Asafa Powell, Shelly-Ann Fraser, Melaine Walker, Brigitte Foster-Hylton and Shericka Williams) were eventually cleared for competition following the personal intervention of IAAF president Lamine Diack.

Team selection

Track and road events

Field and combined events

Also, the Jamaica Amateur Athletic Association selected three reserve athletes: Markino Buckley (400 m hurdles), Vonette Dixon (100 m hurdles), and Ramone McKenzie (200 m).

References

External links
Official competition website

Nations at the 2009 World Championships in Athletics
World Championships in Athletics
Jamaica at the World Championships in Athletics